Surfer Girl is the third album by the American rock band the Beach Boys, released September 16, 1963 on Capitol Records. The album reached number 7 in the US during a chart stay of 56 weeks. This was the first album by the group for which Brian Wilson was given sole production credit. In the UK, it was released in early 1967 and reached number 13.

In 2017, Surfer Girl was ranked the 193rd greatest album of the 1960s by Pitchfork.  This album was one of three released by the Beach Boys in 1963, the other two being Surfin’ USA and Little Deuce Coupe.

Track listing

Notes
 Mike Love was not originally credited for "Catch a Wave" and "Hawaii". His credits were awarded after a 1994 court case.
 Some reissues of the album omit "Little Deuce Coupe" and "Our Car Club".

Charts

References

External links

1963 albums
Albums produced by Brian Wilson
Albums recorded at United Western Recorders
The Beach Boys albums
Capitol Records albums